Revival is the debut album released by Stoner Rock Group Core in 1996.

Tracks 
 Way Down (3:10)
 Cleargod (6:26)
 Kiss The Sun (3:44)
 Sawdust (6:16)
 Shift (3:20)
 Earth (10:02)
 Mosquito Song (7:07)
 Liquid  (3:36)
 Blacksand (7:07)
 Face (23:01) (song lasts 10:50 approx, followed by 5 minutes of feedback and finally a voice announces the "hidden track": "Moo disorder the old man store"
at 15:45)

References

1996 debut albums